Marie-Léontine Tsibinda Bilombo is a Republic of Congo writer. In 1981, she received the National Prize for Poetry. In 1996, the received the Prize Unesco-Aschberg. A native of Girard, she fled the Republic of Congo in 1999 during its civil war, stopping briefly in Niamey before settling in Canada in 2002.

Most recent publications
 L'Oiseau sans arme [The defenceless bird]. (Illustrated by Michel Hengo). Jouy-Le-Moutier (France) : Bajag-Meri, 1999. [Poetry]
 Moi, Congo ou les rêveurs de la souveraineté. Jouy-Le-Moutier (France) : Bajag-Meri, 2000. (204p.)  [Anthology].

Other publications

Poèmes de la terre [Poems of the Earth]. Brazzaville: Editions littéraires congolaises, 1980.
Mayombé. Paris: Saint-Germain-des-Prés, 1980.
Une Lèvre naissant d'une autre [From one word to the next]. Heidelberg: Editions bantoues, 1984.
Demain, un autre jour [Tomorrow is another day]. Paris: Silex, 1987.
L'Oiseau sans arme [The defenceless bird]. (Illustrated by Michel Hengo). Jouy-Le-Moutier (France) : Bajag-Meri, 1999 .

Short Stories

"Mayangi", Peuples Noirs Peuples Africains [Black people White people] 20 (1981), pp. 148–151.
"Quand gronde l'orage" ["When the storm rumbles"], (details of publication unknown, 1982).
"L'irrésistible Dekha Danse" in M.M. Kintende. Un Voyage comme tant d'autres [A Journey like so many others] . Paris: Hatier, 1984.
"La Princess d'ébène", ["The black princess"]Amina 169 (1 September 1985), pp. 64–64.

External links

Interview with Tsibinda by Carmen Babéla

1958 births
Living people
Republic of the Congo writers
Republic of the Congo women writers